Patience Kpobi is a Ghanaian national football player whose playing positions include midfield and defence.

International career 

Although there is no indication that she appeared in the match, she was part of the match squad for the inter-continental play-off between the second placed South American and African teams, against , during the qualifications for the 2008 Olympics.

References 

1984 births
Living people
Ghanaian women's footballers
Women's association football midfielders